John Smillie may refer to:
 John Smillie (soccer)
 John Smillie (mathematician)

See also
John Smilie, Irish-American politician
John Smiley (disambiguation)